Arctic S.A. is the largest Romanian household appliances producer and one of the largest refrigerator producers in Europe. It is located in Găești, Dâmbovița County. The company was bought in 2002 by the largest household appliances manufacturer in Turkey, Arçelik. The company has a production capacity of 2.6 million refrigerators per year. Its products are also made in Russia and Turkey and some Beko fridges are built in this plant.

References 

Manufacturing companies of Romania
Manufacturing companies established in 1968
Romanian brands
Privatized companies in Romania
1968 establishments in Romania